Aribaeus, the king of the Cappadocians, was slain by the Hyrcanians, in the time
of Cyrus the Great (that is, 6th century BCE), according to Xenophon's Cyropaedia.

References

6th-century BC births
6th-century BC rulers
Kings of Cappadocia